The Chegar Perah railway station is a Malaysian train station stationed at and named after the town of Chegar Perah, Lipis District, Pahang.

KTM East Coast Line stations
Lipis District
Railway stations in Pahang